Said Mohamed Rage is a Somali British politician. He has become the Minister of Ports, Marine Transport and Marine Resource of the autonomous Puntland state in northeastern Somalia. Rage is also in charge and founder of the regional counter-piracy program. He is also the head of the other major political and business entities.
During Arte Somali Peace Conference Rage became an MP at transitional parliament and resigned seat following year.

Background
Rage originally from the autonomous puntland in northeastern Somalia, hails Dishiishe. He is dual citizen holding British and Somali citizenships.

References

Ethnic Somali people
Living people
Somalian politicians
Puntland
Year of birth missing (living people)